Surinamese literature refers to the literature which is considered to belong to both the oral traditions as well as Surinamese written literature. The oral literature is still a vital and authentic expression in Surinamese culture. In turn, the influence of the oral culture on the written literature of Suriname is impossible to imagine. At the end of the 18th century the indigenous Surinamese began to write literature. Surinamese Creole literature in particular is "not widely known, nor easily accessible."

See also

List of Surinamese writers

Images of Surinamese writers

References

 
South American literature
Dutch-language literature